The 1962 Arkansas gubernatorial election was held on November 6, 1962.

Incumbent Democratic Governor Orval Faubus won election to a fifth term, defeating Republican nominee Willis Ricketts with 73.27% of the vote.

Primary elections
Primary elections were held on July 31, 1962. By winning over 50% of the vote, Faubus avoided a run-off which would have been held on August 14, 1962.

Democratic primary

Candidates

Dale Alford, U.S. Representative for Arkansas's 5th congressional district
Kenneth Coffelt, attorney and former state senator
David A. Cox, farmer
Orval Faubus, incumbent Governor
Sid McMath, former Governor
Vernon H. Whitten, businessman

Results

Republican primary

Candidates
Willis Ricketts, Pharmacist and former president of the Arkansas Jaycees

Results

General election

Candidates
Orval Faubus, Democratic
Willis Ricketts, Republican

Results

References

Bibliography
 
 

1962
Arkansas
Gubernatorial
November 1962 events in the United States